Grand Prairie Township is one of sixteen townships in Jefferson County, Illinois, USA.  As of the 2010 census, its population was 909 and it contained 391 housing units.

Geography

Cities, towns, villages
 Centralia (south edge)

Unincorporated towns
 Baldwin Heights at 
 Cravat at 
(This list is based on USGS data and may include former settlements.)

Adjacent townships
 Centralia Township, Marion County (north)
 Raccoon Township, Marion County (northeast)
 Rome Township (east)
 Shiloh Township (southeast)
 Casner Township (south)
 Richview Township, Washington County (southwest)
 Irvington Township, Washington County (west)

Cemeteries
The township contains these four cemeteries: Fouts, Gaston, Gilead and Piskey.

Major highways
  Interstate 64
  U.S. Route 51

Airports and landing strips
 Prairie Airport

Lakes
 Superior Lake

Demographics

Political districts
 Illinois' 19th congressional district
 State House District 107
 State Senate District 54

References
 
 United States Census Bureau 2007 TIGER/Line Shapefiles
 United States National Atlas

External links
 City-Data.com
 Illinois State Archives

Townships in Jefferson County, Illinois
Mount Vernon, Illinois micropolitan area
Townships in Illinois